Xenocerus lacrymans is a species of beetles from the family Anthribidae, also known as fungus weevils.

Description 
Xenocerus lacrymans can reach a body length of about 10 mm. The basic colour is brown, with white markings on the head, the pronotum and the elytra.

Subspecies 
 Xenocerus lacrymans herbertus Jordan, 1906
 Xenocerus lacrymans lacrymans J. Thomson, 1857

Distribution 
This species can be found in New Guinea and Aru Islands.

References 

 Biolib
 Global species

Anthribidae
Beetles described in 1857